Dirty South is the debut solo album by Rasheeda. The album features the hit single "Do It". Dirty South was not well received and she was released from her contract with Motown Records.

"Do It" was released three months prior to the album, in December 2000. In late January 2001 the song charted, and it eventually peaked at number 22 on the Billboard Hot R&B/Hip-Hop Songs chart; a music video was released in February 2001. Two subsequent singles—"Get It On", released in April, and "Off da Chain", released in July—both failed to chart.

The album was released in late March 2001 and peaked at number 77 on the Billboard Top R&B/Hip-Hop Albums chart.

Track listing
 "Intro" – 2:08
 "Do It" (featuring Pastor Troy and Re Re) – 3:51
 "Ain't Nuttin" (featuring Jim Crow and Thugz Nation) – 3:54
 "Off da Chain" (featuring Jazze Pha) – 3:55
 "Block to Block" (featuring Akon) – 2:45
 "ATL 2 STL" (featuring Nelly) – 2:53
 "Get It On" (featuring Slim) – 4:10
 "Make It Hot" (featuring Akon) – 3:29
 "Mr. Baller" (featuring Danah Lewis) – 3:48
 "They Don't Understand" (featuring Que Bo Gold) – 3:42
 "No Trust (Don't Try)" – 3:32
 "What Cha Workin' Wit" – 3:40
 "Everywhere I Go" – 3:48
 "I Am da Shit" (featuring Que Bo Gold) – 4:06
 "Not Tonight" (featuring Lil Jon & The Eastside Boyz) – 3:23

References 

2001 debut albums
Rasheeda albums
Albums produced by Lil Jon
Motown albums